The Tujia (Northern Tujia: Bifjixkhar / Bifzixkar, IPA: , Southern Tujia: Mongrzzir,) are an ethnic group and, with a total population of over 8 million, the eighth-largest officially recognized ethnic minority in the People's Republic of China. They live in the Wuling Mountains, straddling the common borders of Hunan, Hubei and Guizhou Provinces and Chongqing Municipality.

The endonym Bizika means "native dwellers". In Chinese, Tujia literally means "local families", in contrast to the Hakka, whose name literally means "guest families" and implies migration.

Origins
Although there are different accounts of their origins, the Tujia may trace their history back over twelve centuries and possibly beyond, to the ancient Ba people who occupied the area around modern-day Chongqing some 2,500 years ago. The Ba Kingdom reached the zenith of its power between 600 BC and 400 BC but was destroyed by the Qin in 316 BC.

After being referred to by a long succession of different names in ancient documents, the Tujia appeared in historical records from about 14th century onwards.

Ming and Qing dynasties
The Tujia tusi chieftains reached the zenith of their power under the Ming dynasty (1368–1644), when they were accorded comparatively high status by the imperial court. They achieved this through their reputation as providers of fierce, highly disciplined fighting men, who were employed by the emperor to suppress revolts by other minorities. On numerous occasions, they helped defend China against outside invaders, such as the wokou ("Japanese" pirates) who ravaged the coast during the 16th century.

The Manchus invaded and conquered the Ming in 1644 and established the Great Qing Empire, known in China as the Qing dynasty. Ever suspicious of local rulers, the Qing emperors always tried to replace Han officials with Manchu officials wherever they could. In the early 18th century, the Qing court finally felt secure enough to establish direct control over minority areas as well. This process, known as gaituguiliu (literally 'replace the local [ruler], return to mainstream [central rule]'), was carried out throughout South-West China gradually and, in general, peacefully. The court adopted a carrot and stick approach of lavish pensions for compliant chieftains, coupled with a huge show of military force on the borders of their territories.

Most of the Tujia areas returned to central control during the period 1728–1735. While the rule of the Qing government was more orderly compared to the rule of chieftains, many in the Tujia peasantry had come resented the attempts of the Qing court to impose national culture and customs on them. With the weakening of central Qing rule, numerous large-scale uprisings occurred, culminating in the violent Taiping Rebellion.

Recent history

Following the collapse of the Qing, the Tujia found themselves caught between various competing warlords. More and more land was given over to the cultivation of high-earning opium at the insistence of wealthy landlords and banditry was rife. After the founding of the People's Republic of China in 1949, Tujia areas came under communist control and banditry was rapidly eradicated. The Great Leap Forward led to mass famine in Tujia communities.

The Tujia were officially recognized as one of the 55 ethnic minorities in January 1957 and a number of autonomous prefectures and counties were subsequently established.

State Councillor Dai Bingguo, one of China's top officials on foreign policy, is the most prominent Tujia in the Chinese government.

Culture
Today, traditional Tujia customs can only be found in the most remote areas.

The Tujia are renowned for their singing and song composing abilities and for their tradition of the Baishou dance (摆手舞), a 500-year-old collective dance which uses 70 ritual gestures to represent war, farming, hunting, courtship and other aspects of traditional life. They are also famous for their richly patterned brocade, known as xilankapu, a product that in earlier days regularly figured in their tribute payments to the Chinese court. For their spring festival they prepare handmade glutinous rice cakes called ciba cake. They gather round the fire to sing folk songs and eat grilled ciba.

Regarding religion, most of the Tujia worship a white tiger totem, although some Tujia in western Hunan worship a turtle totem.

Language

Tujia is a Sino-Tibetan language and is usually considered an isolate within this group.  It has some grammatical and phonological similarities with Nuosu, though its vocabulary is very different.

Today there are at most 70,000 native speakers of the Tujia language, most of whom live in the northern parts Xiangxi Tujia and Miao Autonomous Prefecture in North-Western Hunan Province.

The vast majority of the Tujia use varieties of Chinese, mainly Southwestern Mandarin; a few speak Hmongic languages. Few monolingual Tujia speakers remain; nearly all are bilingual in some dialect of Chinese. Children now learn Chinese from childhood and many young Tujia prefer to use Chinese when communicating among themselves. Among fluent Tujia speakers, Chinese borrowings and even sentence structures, are more common.

Distribution

By province

The Fifth National Population Census of 2000 recorded 8,028,133 Tujia in China.
Provincial Distribution of the Tujia

In Chongqing, Tujia make up 4.67% of the total population; in Hunan, 4.17%; in Guizhou, 4.06%; in Hubei, 3.66%; and in Guangdong, 0.16%.

By county

County-level distributions of the Tujia

(Only includes counties or county-equivalents containing >0.5% of China's Tujia population.)

Autonomous Areas Designated for Tujia

Famous Tujia
ADuo, 阿朵, singer/artiste
He Long
Dai Bingguo
Leo Li
Liao Guoxun
Ren Zhenhe, Governor of Gansu
Shang Chunsong
Shen Mengchen 
Tian Tao, Olympic weightlifter
Zhou Xianwang, Mayor of Wuhan
Zhou Yiwei, actor
Zhang Ju, musician

References

Citations

Sources

Brown, M.J. (2001). "Ethnic Classification and Culture: The Case of the Tujia in Hubei, China," Asian Ethnicity 2(1): 55–72.
Brown, M.J. (2004). "They Came with Their Hands Tied behind Their Backs" – Forced Migrations, Identity Changes, and State Classification in Hubei. Is Taiwan Chinese? (pp. 166–210). Berkeley: University of California Press.
Brown, M.J. (2007). "Ethnic Identity, Cultural Variation, and Processes of Change – Rethinking the Insights of Standardization and Orthopraxy". Modern China. 33(1): 91–124. Sage Publications.
---- 2002. "Local Government Agency: Manipulating Tujia Identity," Modern China.
Ch'en, J. (1992). The Highlanders of Central China: A History 1895–1937. New York: M.E. Sharpe.
Dong, L. (1999). Ba feng Tu yun—Tujia wenhua yuanliu jiexi (Ba Manners, Tu Charm—An Analysis of the Origins of Tujia Culture). Wuhan: Wuhan Daxue Chubanshe.
Dong, L., Brown, M.J., Wu, X. (2002). Tujia. Encyclopedia of World Cultures – Supplement. C. Ember, M. Ember & I. Skoggard (eds.), NY: Macmillan Reference USA, pp. 351–354.
Huang B. (1999). "Tujiazu Zuyuan Yanjiu Zonglun" ("A Review of Research on Tujia Ancestral Origins"). In Tujia zu lizhi wenhua lunji (A Colloquium on Tujia History and Culture), edited by Huang Baiquan and Tian Wanzheng. 25–42. Enshi, Hubei: Hubei Minzu Xueyuan.
Li, S. (1993). Chuandong Youshui Tujia (Tujia of the Youshui River in East Sichuan). Chengdu: Chengdu Chubanshe.
Peng, B., Peng, X. et al. (1981). Jishou University Journal, Humanities Edition #2: Special Issue on Tujia Ethnography [in Chinese]. Jishou: Jishou University.
Shih C. (2001). "Ethnicity as Policy Expedience: Clan Confucianism in Ethnic Tujia-Miao Yongshun," Asian Ethnicity 2(1): 73–88.
Sutton, D. (2000). "Myth Making on an Ethnic Frontier: The Cult of the Heavenly Kings of West Hunan, 1715–1996," Modern China 26(4): 448–500.
Sutton, D. (2003). "Violence and Ethnicity on a Qing Colonial Frontier: Customary and Statutory Law in the Eighteenth-Century Miao Pale". In: Modern Asian Studies 37(1): 41–80. Cambridge University Press.
Sutton, D. (2007). "Ritual, Cultural Standardization, and Orthopraxy in China: Reconsidering James L. Watson’s Ideas". In: Modern China 33(1): 3–21. Sage Publications.
Tien, D., He, T., Chen, K., Li, J., Xie, Z., Peng, X. (1986). Tujiayu Jianzhi (A Brief Chronicle of the Tujia Language). Beijing: Minzu Chubanshe.
Wu, X. (1996). "Changes of chieftains' external policy in the Three Gorges Area in the late Ming and early Qing dynasties [1630s–1660s]". In: Ethnic Forum, (3): 88–92. (Hunan, China)
Wu, X. (1997). "Tujia's food-getting pattern in west Hubei in the Qing Dynasty". In: Journal of Hubei Institute for Nationalities, (2): 33–35. (Hubei, China)
Wu, X. (1997). "On the Tage Dance". In: Journal of Chinese Classics and Culture, (2): 22–29. (Beijing, China)
Wu, X. (2003). "Food, Ethnoecology and Identity in Enshi Prefecture, Hubei, China". (Doctoral Dissertation, University of Alberta, 388 pages).
Wu, X. (2003). "Turning Waste into Things of Value": Marketing Fern, Kudzu and Osmunda in Enshi Prefecture, China. In: Journal of Developing Societies, 19(4): 433–457.
Wu, X. (2004). "Ethnic Foods" and Regional Identity: the Hezha Restaurants in Enshi. In: Food and Foodways, 12(4): 225–246.
Wu, X. (2005). "The New Year's Eve Dinner and Wormwood Meal: Festival Foodways as Ethnic Markers in Enshi". In: Modern China, 31(3): 353–380.
Wu, X. (2006). "Maize, Ecosystem Transition and Ethnicity in Enshi Prefecture, China". In: East Asian History, 31(1): 1–22.
Wu, X. (2010). "Tujia National Minority". Berg Encyclopedia of World Dress and Fashion.
Ye, D. (1995). Tujiayu yanjiu (Studies of the Tujia Language). Jishou, Hunan: Hunan Chu Wenhua Zhongxin, Jishou Daxue.

External links
 Tujia Culture Web

 
Ethnic groups officially recognized by China